Juan Francisco Muñoz Melo (born 25 June 1959) is  a Spanish male handball player. He was a member of the Spain men's national handball team. He was part of the  team at the 1980 Summer Olympics, 1984 Summer Olympics, 1988 Summer Olympics and 1992 Summer Olympics. On club level he played for CB Calpisa in Alicante.

Notes

References

External links
 
 
 
 

1959 births
Living people
Spanish male handball players
Olympic handball players of Spain
Handball players at the 1980 Summer Olympics
Handball players at the 1984 Summer Olympics
Handball players at the 1988 Summer Olympics
Handball players at the 1992 Summer Olympics
People from Santander, Spain